Montclair is a toponym which is French for clear mountain.  It may refer to:

Places in the United States 
Montclair, New Jersey
Montclair Art Museum
Montclair State University
Upper Montclair, New Jersey
Montclair Public Library
 Montclair, California, a city in San Bernardino County
 Montclair, Oakland, California, a neighborhood
 Montclair, Indiana
 Montclair, Lexington, Kentucky
 Montclair (Quincy, Massachusetts), a neighborhood in Quincy
 Montclair, Cumberland County, North Carolina
 Montclair, Davidson County, North Carolina
 Montclair, Fayetteville, North Carolina, a neighborhood
 Montclair, Onslow County, North Carolina
 Montclair, Scotland County, North Carolina
 Montclair, Wilson County, North Carolina
 Sunset Terrace/Montclair, Houston, a neighborhood in Houston, Texas
 Montclair, Virginia

Other uses 
Mercury Montclair, a line of automobiles made by Ford Motor Company in the 1950s
Montclair bottled water, produced by Nestlé Waters North America
Montclair cigarettes, produced by Commonwealth Brands
, a United States Navy refrigerated cargo ship in commission from 1918 to 1919
Operation Montclair, a military operation by the US and Australia during World War II

See also
 Mont Clare (disambiguation)
 Montclair Elementary School (disambiguation)
 Montclair High School (disambiguation)
 Montclair, North Carolina (disambiguation)
 Montclar (disambiguation)
 Mount Clare (disambiguation)
 Moncler, Italian fashion brand